Finito means "finished", "over". It may also refer to:
Ramón "Finito" Rivera, a performer of the salon tango, see .
Ricardo "Finito" López (1966), retired Mexican boxer.
Finito de Badajoz, member of Spanish rock/punk band Reincidentes.
Mike Finito, producer of the mixtape Nehru Jackets by rapper Himanshu Suri.
The final album by Swedish group Radioaktiva räker (2003).
The B side of the single Mondo (1976) by Riccardo Fogli.
A promotional single (2011) for the album Student of the Game by American hip hop artist N.O.R.E. (a.k.a. P.A.P.I).

See also
 Non finito, a sculpting technique.